Kaufman High School is a public high school located in Kaufman, Texas (USA) and classified as a 4A school by the UIL.  It is part of the Kaufman Independent School District located in central Kaufman County.  In 2011, the school was rated "Met Standard" by the Texas Education Agency.

Athletics
The Kaufman Lions compete in the following sports 
Cross Country, Volleyball, Football, Basketball, Powerlifting, Soccer, Golf, Tennis, Track, Softball & Baseball

The Kaufman XC teams have won 9 of the last 16 Regional Championships.

State Titles
Kaufman (UIL)
Boys Cross Country 
2011(3A)

Kaufman Pyle (PVIL)
Boys Track 
1965(PVIL-1A), 1966(PVIL-1A)

References

External links
 

Schools in Kaufman County, Texas
Public high schools in Texas